144 is a 2015 Indian Tamil-language heist comedy film directed by G. Manikandan and produced by C. V. Kumar, starring Shiva, Ashok Selvan, Oviya and Shruthi Ramakrishnan. The film's plot is partially inspired by the novel Vasanthakaala Kutrangal written by Sujatha.

Cast

Shiva as Thesi
Ashok Selvan as Madhaan
Oviya as Kalyani
Shruthi Ramakrishnan as Divya
Ramdoss as Ravi Varman
Madhusudhan Rao as Rayappan, Divya's father  
Sujatha Sivakumar as Meenakshi Rayappan, Divya's mother
Udayabhanu Maheshwaran as 'Feelings' Ravi
"Hello" Kandasaamy as Tube, Thesi's father
Ambani Shankar
Karunakaran as Intro Narrator
S. J. Surya as Narrator

Production
The film was launched by producer C. V. Kumar with new director Manikandan, and it began shooting in February 2015, with a principal cast of Shiva, Ashok Selvan, Oviya and Sruthi Ramakrishnan. The team shot scenes in Madurai, with Ashok Selvan portraying an illegal car racer. After a single long filming schedule, the film was announced to be nearing completion by April 2015.

Soundtrack

Music and soundtracks were composed by Sean Roldan. The soundtrack features six songs, the lyrics for which were written by Kabilan, Sean Roldan, Vivek, Karaikudi and Bharathi Ganesan. Behindwoods rated the album 2.5 out of 5 and called it "An album laced with good energy and fun moments, but falls short of the expectations from a Sean Roldan fare."

Critical reception
M. Suganth of The Times of India rated the film 3 out of 5 and wrote, "You could also call it Mundasupatti-meets-Rajathandhiram and you wouldn't be wrong as like that crime caper, it also about a gold heist that involves an elaborate set-up and planning. But the filmmaking is more Mundasupatti, with noticeable rough edges that keep reminding us that this is a first-timer's film and lacks the sophistication (it is an exposition-filled film) of both Soodhu Kavvum and Rajathandhiram." Baradwaj Rangan of the Hindu called it "A shaky start, but lots of laughs later
"

References

External links
 

2015 films
2015 black comedy films
Indian black comedy films
Films scored by Sean Roldan
Films based on Indian novels
2010s Tamil-language films
2015 directorial debut films